Static Impulse is the second solo album and fourth solo project by Dream Theater lead singer James LaBrie, released on September 28, 2010. In late August 2010, LaBrie released two songs from the album titled "One More Time" and "I Need You".

This album features a more melodic death metal approach while still keeping the progressive elements from the previous albums. Aside from LaBrie's usual clean vocals, the album also features harsh vocals by drummer Peter Wildoer and backing vocals by keyboardist Matt Guillory, who also sang lead on the album's demos.

Track listing

Standard edition

Limited edition Digipack bonus tracks

Personnel
 James LaBrie - lead vocals
 Marco Sfogli - lead and rhythm guitars, programming, additional bass, mixing
 Matt Guillory - keyboards, programming, backing vocals, additional screams, Lead vocals on "Jekyll or Hyde (Demo)"
 Ray Riendeau - bass
 Peter Wildoer - drums, screaming vocals

Production
Arranged and produced by James LaBrie & Matt Guillory
Engineered by Matt Guillory, Johan "The Ant" Ornborg, Ray Riendeau and Marco Sfogli
Pre-production by Matt Guillory and Marco Sfogli
Vocal editing by Alex Durand
Mixed by Jens Bogren and Marco Sfogli
Mastered by Jens Bogren

References

2010 albums
James LaBrie albums
Inside Out Music albums